Vitaliy Volodymyrovych Hrusha (born 20 February 1994) is a Ukrainian professional footballer who plays as a midfielder for Ahrobiznes Volochysk.

Career

Early years
Hrusha is a product of several sports schools throughout western Ukraine including UFK-Karpaty Lviv. His first coach was Volodymyr Matyuk.

Amateur years
In 2013 Hrusha started to play for the Burevisnyk Kremenets in the regional competitions of Ternopil Oblast, later joined a team from his native village that participated in competitions of Rivne Oblast and in 2015 – ODEK Orzhiv. With ODEK Orzhiv he also played in the national amateur competitions. In the spring of 2017 Hrusha joined Ahrobiznes Volochysk, with which he became national champion among amateurs.

Ahrobiznes Volochysk
He made his professional debut for Ahrobiznes Volochysk in the away match against Prykarpattia Ivano-Frankivsk on 14 July 2017 in the Ukrainian Second League scoring a hat-trick in a 5–2 win.

References

External links
 
 
 
 Vitaliy Hrusha: My dream is to obtain trophies of the highest quality (Віталій Груша: "Моя мрія – здобути трофеї найвищого ґатунку"). FC Ahrobiznes Volochysk (from Sport Arena). 21 July 2017

1994 births
Living people
Ukrainian footballers
Association football midfielders
FC ODEK Orzhiv players
FC Ahrobiznes Volochysk players
Ukrainian First League players
Ukrainian Second League players
Sportspeople from Rivne Oblast